The name Ealdgyth (sometimes modernized to Aldith, may refer to

 Ealdgyth, daughter of Uhtred the Bold, Earl of Northumbria (died 1016) and Ælfgifu who is a daughter of Æthelred II
 Ealdgyth (floruit 1015–1016) (born c. 992), wife of Sigeferth and then of King Edmund Ironside
 Ealdgyth, wife of the thane Morcar (died 1015)
 Ealdgyth, daughter of Earl Ælfgar (fl. c. 1057 – 1066), wife of Gruffudd ap Llywelyn and later of Harold Godwineson
 Edith Swanneck  (c. 1025 – c. 1086), concubine of Harold Godwineson
 Ealdgyth of Wallingford, daughter of Wigot and wife of Robert D'Oyly (died 1091)

See also
 Eadgyth (disambiguation),  Old English form of the name (Edith) 
 Eadgifu, sometimes Latinized as Ediva or Edgiva